Glen Jackson (born April 5, 1954 in Vancouver, British Columbia) is a former star linebacker for the BC Lions.

High school & College career
After playing at Notre Dame Regional Secondary School, he went on to play university football at Simon Fraser University.

Canadian Football League career
Jackson would play 12 years with the BC Lions, from 1976 to 1987, including 192 games, and two Grey Cups (1983 and 1985) and one championship (in 1985.) He was a Western All Star six times.

He selected to the Lions 50th anniversary All Time Team and is a member of the BC Lions Wall of Fame.

Post-playing career
Retired from Holy Cross Regional High School in Surrey, British Columbia.

References

1954 births
Living people
BC Lions players
Canadian football linebackers
Players of Canadian football from British Columbia
Simon Fraser Clan football players
Simon Fraser University alumni
Canadian football people from Vancouver